Thumaita is rural village on the southern slope of Mount Kenya located in the Kirinyaga District, Central Province, of Kenya.

Popular culture
Part of Haron Wachira's 1999 novel Waiting for Darkness is set in Thumaita.

Notes

External links
 

 http://mapcarta.com/12704194

Populated places in Central Province (Kenya)